"I'm Getting Used to You" is the title of the fourth single released by Selena from the album Dreaming of You. It was written by Diane Warren and produced by Rhett Lawrence. The song was released on November 26, 1995, by EMI.

Song information
The track was written by songwriter Diane Warren in the key of F#minor with the BPM of 100 and Selena's range here was from F#3-F#5, and was chosen to be the fourth release (third in English language). The song was not as successful as the previous singles, but managed to peak at number 7 on the Billboard Bubbling Under Hot 100 singles chart.

Track listing
US Maxi-CD
 I'm Getting Used To You (Album Version) 	4:03 	
 I'm Getting Used To You (Def Radio Mix) 	3:42 	
 I'm Getting Used To You (Def Club Mix) 	8:40 	
 I'm Getting Used To You (Dub A Dub Mix) 	6:48 	
 I'm Getting Used To You (Beatstrumental Mix) 	5:50

Chart performance

Personnel
Produced and arranged by: Rhett Lawrence
Lead and background vocals by: Selena
Mixed by: Nathaniel "Mick" Guzauski
Engineer: Dan García
Assistant engineer: Cal Harris Jr.
Synthetizers, drums and programming: Rhett Lawrence
Percussion: Luis Conte
Horns: Jerry Hey, Dan Higgens, Gary Grant, Bill Reichenbac
Production coordinator: Janie Smith
Computer tech: Chris Kohler
Recorded at: Oakshire Recorders, Los Angeles, CA
Mixed at: Conway Studios, Hollywood, CA

References

1995 singles
1996 singles
Selena songs
Songs written by Diane Warren
Songs released posthumously
1995 songs
Dance-pop songs
EMI Records singles
Song recordings produced by Rhett Lawrence